The 2022 York United FC season was the fourth season in the history of York United FC. In addition to the Canadian Premier League, the club competed in the Canadian Championship.

This was the club's first season led by Martin Nash, who was announced as the club's new head coach on December 21, 2021.

Current squad
As of August 11, 2022.

Transfers

In

Loans in

Draft picks 
York United will make the following selections in the 2022 CPL–U Sports Draft. Draft picks are not automatically signed to the team roster. Only those who are signed to a contract will be listed as transfers in.

Out

Transferred out

Loans out

Pre-season and friendlies

Competitions
Matches are listed in Toronto local time: Eastern Daylight Time (UTC−4) until November 5, and Eastern Standard Time (UTC−5) otherwise.

Overview

Canadian Premier League

Table

Results by match

Matches

Canadian Championship

Statistics

Squad and statistics 

|-
! colspan="14" style="background:#dcdcdc; text-align:center"| Goalkeepers

|-
! colspan="14" style="background:#dcdcdc; text-align:center"| Defenders

|-
! colspan="14" style="background:#dcdcdc; text-align:center"| Midfielders

|-
! colspan="14" style="background:#dcdcdc; text-align:center"| Forwards

|}

Top scorers 
{| class="wikitable sortable alternance"  style="font-size:85%; text-align:center; line-height:14px; width:85%;"
|-
!width=10|Rank
!width=10|Nat.
! scope="col" style="width:275px;"|Player
!width=10|Pos.
!width=80|Canadian Premier League
!width=80|Canadian Championship
!width=80|TOTAL
|-
|rowspan=1|1|||| Osaze De Rosario         || FW || 12 || 1 ||13
|-
|rowspan=1|2|||| Molham Babouli           || FW || 5 || 0 ||5
|-
|rowspan=1|3|||| Jordan Wilson            || MF || 3 || 0 ||3
|-
|rowspan=4|4|||| Sebastian Gutierrez       || MF || 2 || 0 ||2
|-
||| Ronan Kratt                           || FW || 2 || 0 ||2
|-
||| Luis Lawrie-Lattanzio                 || FW || 2 || 0 ||2
|-
||| Chrisnovic N'sa                       || DF || 2 || 0 ||2
|-
|rowspan=6|5|||| Diyaeddine Abzi          || DF || 0 || 1 ||1
|-
||| Lisandro Cabrera                      || FW || 1 || 0 ||1
|-
||| Isaiah Johnston                       || MF || 0 || 1 ||1
|-
||| Oliver Minatel                        || MF || 1 || 0 ||1
|-
||| Roger Thompson                        || DF || 0 || 1 ||1
|-
||| Dominick Zator                        || DF || 1 || 0 ||1
|-
|- class="sortbottom"
| colspan="4"|Totals||31||4||35

Top assists 
{| class="wikitable sortable alternance"  style="font-size:85%; text-align:center; line-height:14px; width:85%;"
|-
!width=10|Rank
!width=10|Nat.
! scope="col" style="width:275px;"|Player
!width=10|Pos.
!width=80|Canadian Premier League
!width=80|Canadian Championship
!width=80|TOTAL
|-
|rowspan=3|1|||| Osaze De Rosario                              || FW || 3 || 0 ||3
|-
||| Isaiah Johnston                                            || MF || 3 || 0 ||3
|-
||| Chrisnovic N'sa                                            || DF || 3 || 0 ||3
|-
|rowspan=5|2|||| Diyaeddine Abzi                               || DF || 1 || 1 ||2
|-
||| Molham Babouli                                             || FW || 2 || 0 ||2
|-
||| Paris Gee                                                  || DF || 2 || 0 ||2
|-
||| Noah Verhoeven                                             || MF || 2 || 0 ||2
|-
||| Lowell Wright                                              || FW || 0 || 2 ||2
|-
|rowspan=8|3||||| Kevin Dos Santos                             || MF || 1 || 0 ||1
|-
||| Sebastian Gutierrez       || MF || 1 || 0 ||1
|-
||| Mateo Hernández                                            || MF || 1 || 0 ||1
|-
||| Mouhamadou Kane                                            || MF || 0 || 1 ||1
|-
||| Ronan Kratt                                                || FW || 1 || 0 ||1
|-
||| Luis Lawrie-Lattanzio                                      || FW || 1 || 0 ||1
|-
||| Cédric Toussaint                                           || MF || 1 || 0 ||1
|-
||| Dominick Zator                                             || DF || 1 || 0 ||1
|-
|- class="sortbottom"
| colspan="4"|Totals||23||4||27

Clean sheets 
{| class="wikitable sortable alternance"  style="font-size:85%; text-align:center; line-height:14px; width:85%;"
|-
!width=10|Rank
!width=10|Nat.
! scope="col" style="width:275px;"|Player
!width=80|Canadian Premier League
!width=80|Canadian Championship
!width=80|TOTAL
|-
|rowspan=1|1|||| Niko Giantsopoulos                             || 6 || 0 ||6
|-
|rowspan=1|2|||| Eleias Himaras                                 || 1 || 0 ||1
|-
|- class="sortbottom"
| colspan="3"|Totals||7||0||7

Disciplinary record 
{| class="wikitable sortable alternance"  style="font-size:85%; text-align:center; line-height:14px; width:85%;"
|-
!rowspan="2" width=10|No.
!rowspan="2" width=10|Pos.
!rowspan="2" width=10|Nat.
!rowspan="2" scope="col" style="width:275px;"|Player
!colspan="2" width=80|Canadian Premier League
!colspan="2" width=80|Canadian Championship
!colspan="2" width=80|TOTAL
|-
! !!  !!  !!  !!  !! 
|-
|1||GK|||| Niko Giantsopoulos                         ||3||0||0||0||3||0
|-
|3||DF|||| Tass Mourdoukoutas                         ||2||0||0||0||2||0
|-
|4||MF|||| Jordan Wilson                              ||7||1||1||0||8||1
|-
|5||DF|||| Dominick Zator                             ||2||0||1||0||3||0
|-
|6||DF|||| Roger Thompson                             ||3||0||0||0||3||0
|-
|8||MF|||| Sebastian Gutierrez  ||2||0||1||0||3||0
|-
|9||FW|||| Lisandro Cabrera                           ||1||0||0||0||1||0
|-
|10||MF|||| Mateo Hernández                           ||6||1||1||0||7||1
|-
|11||MF|||| Kevin Dos Santos                          ||2||0||1||0||2||0
|-
|15||MF|||| Max Ferrari          ||2||0||0||0||2||0
|-
|17||FW|||| Mouhamadou Kane                           ||1||0||0||0||1||0
|-
|19||MF|||| Noah Verhoeven                            ||4||0||1||0||5||0
|-
|20||DF|||| Diyaeddine Abzi                           ||5||0||0||0||5||0
|-
|22||FW|||| Austin Ricci                              ||1||0||0||0||1||0
|-
|24||FW|||| Osaze De Rosario                          ||5||0||0||0||5||0
|-
|25||FW|||| Luis Lawrie-Lattanzio                     ||3||0||0||0||3||0
|-
|28||MF|||| Cédric Toussaint                          ||3||2||2||0||5||2
|-
|33||MF|||| Matthew Baldisimo                         ||1||0||0||0||1||0
|-
|44||MF|||| Isaiah Johnston                           ||8||0||1||0||9||0
|-
|66||DF|||| Chrisnovic N'sa                           ||5||1||2||0||7||1
|-
|80||FW|||| Lowell Wright                             ||1||0||0||0||1||0
|-
|- class="sortbottom"
| colspan="4"|Totals||67||5||10||0||77||5

References

External links 
 Official site

2022
2022 Canadian Premier League
Canadian soccer clubs 2022 season
2022 in Ontario